Aleš Škerle (born 14 June 1982) is a retired Czech football player. He is currently working as a team leader for SK Sigma Olomouc.

Honours 
SK Sigma Olomouc
 Czech Cup: 2011–12
 Czech Supercup: 2012

References

External links
 Profile at iDNES.cz
 Guardian Football

Czech footballers
SK Sigma Olomouc players
FK Baník Most players
Sportspeople from Třebíč
1982 births
Living people
Association football defenders